The action of 23 August 1806 was a minor naval battle of the Napoleonic wars, fought off the coast of Spanish Cuba near the port of Havana. The Spanish frigate Pomona was captured by the frigates HMS Anson and HMS Arethusa under the commands of Captain Charles Lydiard and Charles Brisbane respectively. As well as the frigate being captured, a shore battery was silenced and a fleet of gunboats was defeated.

Summary
Background
The Royal Navy dominated the West Indies region after the French defeat at San Domingo. The Spanish had been on the defensive due to the diminished French naval power and the subsequent blockade of Cádiz, which had been made possible by the battle of Trafalgar. Lydiard was appointed to command the 38-gun  in 1805. Anson had originally been a 64-gun third rate, but had been razeed in 1794. He sailed Anson to the West Indies in early 1806 and in August was sailing in company with Captain Charles Brisbane's  when on 23 August they came across the 38-gun Spanish frigate Pomona off Havana, guarded by a shore battery and twelve gunboats.

Action
The Pomona attempted to enter the harbour whereupon Lydiard and Brisbane bore up and engaged her. The gunboats came out to defend her, whereupon the two British frigates anchored between the shore battery and gunboats on one side, and the Pomona on the other. A hard fought action began, lasting for 35 minutes until the Pomona struck her colours. Three of the gunboats were blown up, six were sunk, and the remaining three were badly damaged. Some of the Spanish were rescued in all total of 317 were captured many of them wounded. The shore battery ceased fire after an explosion damaged it.

Aftermath
There were no casualties aboard Anson, but Arethusa lost two killed and 32 wounded, with Brisbane among the latter. Charles Brisbane would later take the Dutch island of Curaçao in January 1807, using Anson to achieve that goal.

References
Citations

Bibliography

 
 
 
 
 
 
 

Naval battles involving Spain
Naval battles involving the United Kingdom
Naval battles of the Napoleonic Wars
Conflicts in 1806
August 1806 events